Kimberly Butler (born 7 September 1982) is a British professional basketball player. She plays for Great Britain women's national basketball team and SK Cēsis from Latvia. She competed in the 2012 Summer Olympics.

Santa Clara and Oregon State statistics 

Source

References 

Living people
1982 births
British women's basketball players
Basketball players at the 2012 Summer Olympics
Olympic basketball players of Great Britain
Oregon State Beavers women's basketball players
Panathinaikos WBC players